Gudrun Fiil (18 December 1890 – 19 May 1972) was inn keeper at Hvidsten Inn and member of the Danish resistance, whose husband, son and son-in-law were executed by the German occupying power.

Biography 
Gudrun Fiil was born in Gødstrup præstegaard, Snejbjerg on 18 December 1890 to tenant Kristen Kristensen and 38-year-old Kristine Bolette Kristensen and baptized Gudrun Margrethe Kjul Kristensen in Snejbjerg church on Quinquagesima Sunday the following year. On 29 October 1906 her name was changed to Gudrun Margrethe Kjul Kristensen Søvang.

In 1917, she married Marius Fiil, who in 1918 and 1920 when she gave birth to their two first children Kirstine and Niels was a house proprietor and bicycle dealer.

In 1930, she and her husband lived in Hvidsten Inn with her 72-year-old father-in-law as inn keeper, their son and four daughters and a farm hand, a maid and a manager. In the autumn of 1932, her oldest daughter was confirmed, at that time she and her husband had taken over the inn.

During the occupation Fill and her family became the center of a resistance group, the Hvidsten group. With the group she helped the British Special Operations Executive parachute weapons and supplies into Denmark for distribution to the resistance.

In March 1944, the Gestapo made an "incredible number of arrests" including in the region of Randers the "nationally known folklore collector and keeper of Hvidsten inn Marius Fiil", their son Niels, their 17-year-old daughter Gerda, their daughter Kirstine and her husband brewery worker Peter Sørensen.

The arrests left Fiil alone not only with the inn and her youngest daughter Linna who was confirmed 26 March 1944, but also Fiil's infant grandchild Gudrun, whose both parents were incarcerated.

The following month De frie Danske reported on her husband again, that he along with other arrestees from Hvidsten had been transferred from Randers to Vestre Fængsel.

On 29 June 1944, her husband, their son Niels, their son-in-law and five other members of the Hvidsten group were executed in Ryvangen.

On 15 July 1944, De frie Danske reported on the executions, the life sentence of her older daughter and the two-year sentence of her younger daughter and compared her husband to Svend Gønge and Niels Ebbesen while lamenting her profound loss:

In the January 1945 issue of the resistance newspaper Frit Danmark (Free Denmark) reported that on 29 June 1944 the executions of the Hvidsten group members had taken place.

On 2 July 1945, the remains of her husband and son were found in Ryvangen and transferred to the Department of Forensic Medicine of the university of Copenhagen. The remains of her son-in-law and the five other executed members of the group were found in the same area three days later. The following inquests showed that they had been executed with gunshot wounds to the chest. On 10 July 1945, her executed family members and the five other executed group members were cremated at Bispebjerg Cemetery.

As a widow she continued as keeper of the Hvidsten Inn, until her death in 1972.

Portrayal in the media
In the 2012 Danish drama film Hvidsten Gruppen (This Life), Gudrun Fiil is portrayed by Bodil Jørgensen.

References

1890 births
1972 deaths
Danish people of World War II
Danish resistance members